Kazuyuki Kiyohei Tsukigawa (1874–1948) was a notable Japanese-born New Zealand mariner and salvation army officer. He was born in Konoura-mura, Uku, Nagasaki Prefecture, Japan in 1874. He was the captain of the steam boat paddle PS Clutha which plied on the Clutha River.

Notable descendants include, Sarah Tsukigawa who is a New Zealand former International cricketer.

References

1874 births
1948 deaths
People from Nagasaki Prefecture
Japanese sailors
New Zealand sailors
Japanese emigrants to New Zealand
New Zealand people of Japanese descent
New Zealand Salvationists